Around the World with Three Dog Night is a double live album by American rock band Three Dog Night, released in 1973.

Track listing
"One Man Band" (Billy Fox, January Tyme, Thomas Jefferson Kaye) – 2:33
"Never Been to Spain" (Hoyt Axton) – 3:33
"Going in Circles" (Jaiananda, Ted Myers) – 2:44
"The Family of Man" (Jack Conrad, Paul Williams) – 2:50
"Midnight Runaway" (Gary Itri) – 5:51
"Liar" (Russ Ballard) – 3:49
"Good Feeling 1957" (Alan Brackett, John Merrill) – 4:36
"Organ Solo" (Greenspoon) – 4:36
"Eli's Coming" (Laura Nyro, Cory Wells) – 4:23
"Joy to the World" (Axton) – 2:40
"Black and White" (David I. Arkin, Earl Robinson) – 2:56
"Pieces of April" (Dave Loggins) – 4:07
"Out in the Country" (Roger Nichols, Paul Willams) – 3:25
"Mama Told Me (Not to Come)" (Randy Newman) – 2:59
"Drum Solo" (Sneed) – 5:53
"An Old Fashioned Love Song" (Paul Williams) – 3:51
"Jam" (Three Dog Night) – 7:04

Personnel

Musicians
Cory Wells - vocals
Chuck Negron - vocals
Danny Hutton - vocals
Mike Allsup - guitar
Joe Schermie - bass
Floyd Sneed - drums
Jimmy Greenspoon - keyboard

Production
Producer: Richard Podolar
Recording engineer: Alan Perkins (Pye Mobile Recording Unit)

Charts
Album - Billboard (United States)

Certifications

References

1973 live albums
Three Dog Night albums
Albums produced by Richard Podolor
Dunhill Records live albums